Nusrat Bano Sehar Abbasi is a Pakistani politician who is a Member of the Provincial Assembly of Sindh, from 2008.

Early life and education
She was born on 29 January 1969 in Rohri.

She earned a Bachelor of Arts in Economics, Bachelor of Law and the Master of Arts in Economics, all from Shah Abdul Latif University.

Political career
She was elected to the Provincial Assembly of Sindh as a candidate of Pakistan Muslim League (F) (PML-F) on a reserved seat for women in 2008 Pakistani general election.

She was re-elected to the Provincial Assembly of Sindh as a candidate of PML-F on a reserved seat for women in 2013 Pakistani general election.

She was re-elected to the Provincial Assembly of Sindh as a candidate of Grand Democratic Alliance (GDA) on a reserved seat for women in 2018 Pakistani general election.

References

Living people
Sindh MPAs 2013–2018
Sindh MPAs 2008–2013
1969 births
Grand Democratic Alliance MPAs (Sindh)
Sindhi people